KJMC (89.3 FM) is a non-commercial educational radio station serving the Des Moines, Iowa area with an Urban Adult Contemporary format.  KJMC is owned by Minority Communications, Inc.

The station was originally licensed as KLNQ on November 2, 1998, replacing KUCB-FM after Minority Communications successfully challenged its license in a seven-year battle. It changed its callsign to KJMC on March 1, 1999, when it launched.

KJMC is the Des Moines market affiliate for the Tom Joyner Morning Show and the D. L. Hughley Show.  Since KJMC is a non-commercial station, the national commercials are replaced with music, public service announcements and underwriting announcements from local businesses.

See also
List of community radio stations in the United States

External links

JMC
Urban adult contemporary radio stations in the United States